Joel Greenberg (born 1946) is an educational technology consultant and historian on the role of Bletchley Park in World War II.

Greenberg gained a PhD degree in numerical mathematics from the University of Manchester (UMIST) in 1973. For over 33 years, he worked for the Open University and held a number of director-level management positions. He lectures and writes about Bletchley Park and its role in World War II. He also conducts tours of the site. He is author of biographies about Gordon Welchman, a key figure at Bletchley Park during WWII, and Alastair Denniston, the first operational head of GCHQ. In 2017, he contributed a chapter to The Turing Guide on the German WWII Enigma machine.

Books

References

External links
 Books by Joel Greenberg on Amazon.co.uk

1946 births
Living people
Alumni of the University of Manchester Institute of Science and Technology
People associated with the Open University
Bletchley Park people
English biographers
21st-century English historians
English military historians
Historians of World War II
Historians of technology
Tour guides